Yevheniya Prokofyeva or Yevheniia Prokofieva (born 5 June 1995) is a Ukrainian long-distance runner. In 2020, she competed in the women's half marathon at the 2020 World Athletics Half Marathon Championships held in Gdynia, Poland.

References

External links 
 

Living people
1995 births
Place of birth missing (living people)
Ukrainian female long-distance runners
Ukrainian female marathon runners
Athletes (track and field) at the 2020 Summer Olympics
Olympic athletes of Ukraine
Ukrainian female cross country runners